Gopher wood or gopherwood is a term used once in the Bible for the material used to construct Noah's ark. Although some English Bibles attempt a translation, older English translations such as the King James Version (17th century) leave it untranslated. The word is unrelated to the North American animal known as the gopher.

Identity 

The Jewish Encyclopedia states that it was most likely a translation of the Babylonian , 'cedar beams', or the Assyrian , 'reeds'.

Many modern English translations favor cypress (otherwise referred to in Biblical Hebrew as ). This was espoused (among others) by Adam Clarke, a Methodist theologian famous for his commentary on the Bible: Clarke cited a resemblance between Greek word for cypress, and the Hebrew word .

Others, noting the visual similarity between the Hebrew letters g (gimel ) and k (kaf ), suggest that the word may actually be , the Hebrew word meaning 'pitch'; thus  wood would be 'pitched wood'. Recent suggestions have included a lamination process (to strengthen the Ark), or a now-lost type of tree, but there is no consensus.

References

External links
Gopherwood and Construction of the Ark 
The Free Dictionary - "Gopherwood" (giving a definition of Cladrastis kentukea)

Noah's Ark
Wood
Plants in the Bible
Plant common names